Simon Thelwall or Theloal (1525/26–1586), of Plas y Ward, Llanynys, Denbighshire, was a Welsh politician.

He was a Member (MP) of the Parliament of England for Denbigh Boroughs March 1553, October 1553, 1559 and 1571, and for Denbighshire in 1563.

He married Margaret Griffith, daughter of William Griffith.

References

1520s births
1586 deaths
16th-century Welsh politicians
Members of the Parliament of England (pre-1707) for constituencies in Wales
English MPs 1553 (Edward VI)
English MPs 1553 (Mary I)
English MPs 1559
English MPs 1563–1567
English MPs 1571